is a passenger railway station located in the city of Hachiōji, Tokyo, Japan, operated by the private railway operator Keio Corporation.

Lines 

Station layout 
This station consists of two ground-level opposed side platforms serving two tracks, connected by a footbridge.

Platforms

History
The station opened on 20 March 1931.

Passenger statistics
In fiscal 2019, the station was used by an average of 5,231 passengers daily. 

The passenger figures (boarding passengers only) for previous years are as shown below.

Surrounding area
 Koen-ji
 Fujimori Park
 Tama Youth Detention Center
 Municipal Midorimachi Cemetery

See also
 List of railway stations in Japan

References

External links

 Keio station information 

Keio Takao Line
Stations of Keio Corporation
Railway stations in Tokyo
Railway stations in Japan opened in 1931
Hachiōji, Tokyo